Mosque Tevragh Zeina is a mosque in Tevragh-Zeina, Nouakchott, Mauritania. It is located southeast of the Stade olympique, immediately to the east of the Clinique Chiva.

See also
 Islam in Mauritania

References

Buildings and structures in Nouakchott
Mosques in Mauritania